The following highways are numbered 20B:

New Zealand
 New Zealand State Highway 20B

United States
 Nebraska Highway 20B (former)
 New York State Route 20B (former)
 County Route 20B (Greene County, New York)